Dr John Milson Rhodes (1847- 25 September 1909) was a general practitioner in the suburb of Didsbury, Manchester, UK. He was noted as a  pioneer of social reform.

He was born at Broughton, Salford in 1847 and studied medicine in Glasgow and at Owen's College, Manchester. He was a member of the Chorlton Board of Guardians from 1882 and involved with the workhouse which later became Withington Hospital. He helped to set up the Styal Cottage Homes.  He established the Northern Workhouse Nursing Association and the Chorlton workhouse became a pioneer of trained nursing, held out by Florence Nightingale as an example.

He established the Langho Colony for Epileptics in 1904 and was involved with the David Lewis Epileptics Colony.

Death and memorials

He died from the effects of strychnine which he administered to himself.

After his death, a  clock tower was erected in his memory in the forecourt of Didsbury railway station.  The Edwardian Baroque Portland stone clock incorporates a pair of drinking fountains and bears a bronze plaque which displays a relief medallion portrait of Rhodes. The inscription reads .  Although the station was demolished in 1982, the clock still stands as a local landmark and is Grade II listed.

A Wetherspoons public house in Didsbury, the Milson Rhodes, was named after him, but was replaced in 2017.

References

Poor law infirmaries
1847 births
1909 deaths
British general practitioners
People from Salford
People from Didsbury
English humanitarians